Tiger Bay is a district of Cardiff.

Tiger Bay may also refer to:

Arts and entertainment
Tiger Bay (1934 film), a British film starring Anna May Wong
Tiger Bay (1959 film), a British film starring John and Hayley Mills, and Horst Buchholz
Tiger Bay (album), a 1994 album by Saint Etienne 
"Tiger Bay", a song from the 1979 album Attila by Mina
"Tiger Bay", a song by The Hennessys

Other uses
Tiger Bay, a body of water in south-central Echols County, Georgia
, a former Argentine patrol boat
Tiger Bay State Forest, a forest in Volusia County, Florida
Tiger Bay Club, a political club in Florida
Tiger Bay Brawlers, a roller derby league founded in April 2010

See also 
 Tiger's Bay, area of Belfast, Northern Ireland